The 2016 European Junior and U23 Canoe Slalom Championships took place in Solkan, Slovenia from 24 to 28 August 2016 under the auspices of the European Canoe Association (ECA). It was the 18th edition of the competition for Juniors (U18) and the 14th edition for the Under 23 category. A total of 19 medal events took place. The men's junior C2 team event did not take place.

Medal summary

Men

Canoe

Junior

U23

Kayak

Junior

U23

Women

Canoe

Junior

U23

Kayak

Junior

U23

Medal table

References

External links
European Canoe Association

European Junior and U23 Canoe Slalom Championships
European Junior and U23 Canoe Slalom Championships